Symphlebia citraria is a moth in the family Erebidae. It was described by Paul Dognin in 1889. It is found in Ecuador, Venezuela and Peru.

References

Natural History Museum Lepidoptera generic names catalog

Moths described in 1889
citraria